The Best of Hot Tuna is a Hot Tuna compilation album released in 1998.  It covers songs from all the Hot Tuna albums released on Grunt Records.  Bill Thompson, former manager of Jefferson Airplane and Hot Tuna helped select the songs for inclusion.  The artwork on the cover is a painting of Jorma Kaukonen and Jack Casady made by Grace Slick.  The album was released as a double CD.

Track listing

Disc one
"Hesitation Blues" (Traditional) (from Hot Tuna) – 5:05
"Know You Rider" (Traditional) (from Hot Tuna) – 4:07
"Winin' Boy Blues" (Jelly Roll Morton) (from Hot Tuna) – 5:31
"Mann's Fate" (Jorma Kaukonen) (from Hot Tuna) – 5:20
"Keep Your Lamps Trimmed and Burning" (Rev. Gary Davis) (from First Pull Up, Then Pull Down) – 8:15
"Candy Man" (Davis) (from First Pull Up, Then Pull Down) – 5:48
"Been So Long" (Kaukonen) (Studio Version) (from "Been So Long" single) – 3:45
"Keep On Truckin'" (B. Carleton) (from Burgers) – 3:40
"99 Year Blues" (Julius Daniels) (from Burgers) – 3:57
"Ode for Billy Dean" (Kaukonen) (from Burgers) – 4:50
"Sea Child" (Kaukonen) (from Burgers) – 5:00
"Water Song" (Kaukonen) (from Burgers) – 5:15
"I See the Light" (Kaukonen) (from The Phosphorescent Rat) – 4:15
"Living Just for You" (Kaukonen) (from The Phosphorescent Rat) – 3:18
"Easy Now" (Kaukonen) (from The Phosphorescent Rat) – 5:10
"Sally Where'd You Get Your Liquor From" (Davis) (from The Phosphorescent Rat) – 2:56

Disc two
"Hit Single #1" (Kaukonen) (from America's Choice) – 5:13
"Serpent of Dreams" (Kaukonen) (from America's Choice) – 6:51
"Sleep Song" (Kaukonen) (from America's Choice) – 4:23
"Funky #7" (Jack Casady, Kaukonen) (from America's Choice) – 5:47
"Hot Jelly Roll Blues" (Bo Carter) (from Yellow Fever) – 4:21
"Sunrise Dance with the Devil" (Kaukonen) (from Yellow Fever) – 4:28
"Bar Room Crystal Ball" (Kaukonen) (from Yellow Fever) – 6:52
"I Wish You Would" (Billy Boy Arnold) (from Hoppkorv) – 3:10
"Watch the North Wind Rise" (Kaukonen) (from Hoppkorv) – 4:39
"It's So Easy" (Buddy Holly, Norman Petty) (from Hoppkorv) – 2:35
"Song from the Stainless Cymbal" (Kaukonen) (from Hoppkorv) – 4:02
"Genesis" (Kaukonen) (from Double Dose) – 4:27
"Rock Me Baby" (Joe Josea, B. B. King) (previously unreleased) – 7:36
"Extrication Love Song" (Kaukonen) (from Double Dose) – 5:20

Personnel
Jorma Kaukonen – guitars, vocals
Jack Casady – bass
Will Scarlett – harmonica
Sammy Piazza – drums
Papa John Creach – violin
Bob Steeler – drums
Nick Buck – synthesizer

Production
Paul Williams – producer, compilation, tape research
Bill Thompson – compilation, assistant
Ray Loughren – assistant, sequencer
Jim Cooperman – assistant
Brian Mayer – assistant
Bill Lacey – audio restoration
Mike Harty – digital transfer
Michael Drexler – digital transfer
Dalita Keumurian – project director
Dave Cohen – essay
Tori Larkey – vault research
Jack Rovner – creative director
Henry Marquez – art direction
Grace Slick – illustrations
Mike Diehl – design

References

1998 greatest hits albums
Hot Tuna compilation albums
RCA Records compilation albums